Lara Colturi (born 15 November 2006) is an Italian-Albanian World Cup alpine skier competing from 2022 for Albania in technical and speed events, winner at senior level, of the 2022 FIS Alpine Ski South American Cup.

Biography

Daughter of former Olympic champion Daniela Ceccarelli and ski coach Alessandro Colturi, she has a younger brother, Yuri (born 2011). Born in Turin but living with her family in Cesana Torinese in the Susa Valley, she has shown great talent in skiing since she was a young girl. 

Her mother Daniela Ceccarelli started consulting for Albanian Ski Federation in 2020/2021, and became Technical Director of the Alpine women team the following season. By May 2022 Lara got her (first) FIS affiliation with Albanian Ski Federation, so to continuing being trained by her parents and having open access to any level of competitions.

After outstanding performances in FIS Children category, at her first FIS races in summer 2022, Lara’s achieved excellent results, including winning the Overall, Slalom, Giant Slalom, Alpine Combined  titles. At that point her debut in the World Cup on 22 October 2022 opening race in Solden in Austria, although the girl has not yet turned 16, as had happened to Mikaela Shiffrin, is starting to be more of a serious probability.

On 19 November 2022, on the occasion of the beginning of the 2023 Alpine Ski World Cup, Lara Colturi made her debut in the slalom of Levi, Finland, missing the qualification for the second manche for 9 hundreds of a second from the top 30, however the following week in the giant slalom she closed the race in 17th thus earning her first points in the Alpine Ski World Cup.

Lara Colturi became the third ever youngest gold medalist at Junior World Championships 2023, in St. Anton, Austria (Super-G) and conquered several results among the top 30 in World Cup in her first FIS category season.

On the morning of February 7, 2023, while she was training in super-G and shortly thereafter he was due to compete in the timed trial for the world championships in Meribel, he was injured and broke the cruciate ligament in his right knee. Finished World Championships, in which she should have competed in the 4 competitions with the exception of the combined, even before the start and the end of the season. Expected times for the return: six months.

World Cup results

Season standings

Results per discipline
	

	
Standings through 25 January 2023

South American Cup results
Colturi has won an overall South American Cup and three specialty standings.

Overall: 2022
Slalom: 2022
Giant slalom: 2022
Combined: 2022

World Junior Championships results

References

External links
 

2006 births
Living people
Albanian female alpine skiers
Italian female alpine skiers
Sportspeople from Turin